Bernard Fischer (30 May 1902 – 1 January 1971) was a Luxembourgian footballer. He competed in the men's tournament at the 1928 Summer Olympics.

References

External links
 

1902 births
1971 deaths
Luxembourgian footballers
Luxembourg international footballers
Olympic footballers of Luxembourg
Footballers at the 1928 Summer Olympics
People from Differdange
Association football defenders
FA Red Boys Differdange players